The 2021–22 Biathlon IBU Cup was a multi-race tournament over a season of biathlon, organised by the IBU. IBU Cup is the second-rank competition in biathlon after the Biathlon World Cup. The season started on 25 November 2021 in Idre, Sweden and ended on 13 March 2022 in Ridnaun-Val Ridanna, Italy. 

The defending overall champions from the 2020–21 Biathlon IBU Cup were Filip Fjeld Andersen from Norway and Vanessa Voigt from Germany.

Due to the Russian invasion of Ukraine, Russian and Belarusian biathletes are only allowed to compete under a neutral flag since the competition in Kontiolahti. Their performances are not included in the previous classifications of their countries. Previously, the Ukrainian national team announced the withdrawal from the biathlon competition by the end of the season.

On 2 March 2022, IBU announced that Russian and Belarusian biathletes are banned from IBU events.

Calendar
Below is the IBU Cup calendar for the 2021–22 season.

Notes
 All European Championships races included in the IBU Cup total score.
 The round originally scheduled at Duszniki-Zdrój, Poland was relocated to Brezno-Osrblie, Slovakia.

IBU Cup podiums

Men

Women

Mixed

Standings (men)

Overall

Under 25

Individual

Sprint

Pursuit

Mass start

Super Sprint

Nations Cup

Standings (women)

Overall

Under 25

Individual

Sprint

Pursuit

Mass start

Super Sprint

Nations Cup

Mixed relay standings

Podium table by nation 
Table showing the IBU Cup podium places (gold–1st place, silver–2nd place, bronze–3rd place) by the countries represented by the athletes.

See also 
2021–22 Biathlon World Cup

References

External links
IBU official site

IBU Cup
2021 in biathlon
2022 in biathlon